Tinu Verma  is an Indian actor, story writer and producer and action director known for his works in Hindi cinema.

Filmography

Stunt director
Shola Aur Shabnam (1992)
Khuda Gawah (1992)
Aankhen (1993)
Himmat (1996)
Loafer (1996)
Jeet (1996)
Raja Hindustani (1996)
Gadar: Ek Prem Katha (2001)
Jaani Dushman: Ek Anokhi Kahani (2002)
Soutan (2009; Bhojpuri)
Puli (2010; Telugu)

Actor
Aankhen (1993)
Himmat (1996)
Ghatak: Lethal (1996)
Mela (2000)
Maa Tujhe Salaam (2002)
Soutan (2009)
This Weekend (2013)
Dulhan Chahi Pakistan Se (2016)
Karmaphal Data Shani (2016)
Laila Majnu (2020; Bhojpuri)
°′′Kisi Ka Bhai Kisi Ki Jaan [ 2023]  
Director
Maa Tujhe Salaam (2002)
Baaz: A Bird in Danger (2003)
Raja Thakur (2006)
This Weekend (2012)
Ghulami (2015)

Personal life
Tinu Verma attacked his stepbrother Manohar Verma with a sword and was arrested by police.

References

External links
 

Living people
Hindi-language film directors
Indian male film actors
Indian action choreographers
20th-century Indian film directors
21st-century Indian film directors
20th-century Indian male actors
21st-century Indian male actors
Male actors in Hindi cinema
Year of birth missing (living people)